Billy Phipps (25 December 1931 – 3 December 2011) was an American jazz baritone saxophonist and composer who  contributed to the development of a wide range of jazz styles including hard bop, soul jazz, Latin jazz, and primitive.

Career 
Phipps was born on December 25, 1931, in Newark, New Jersey, United States into a jazz family.  Phipp's cousin, Eugene Phipps, Sr. traveled with Billie Holiday, Joe Guy, Max Roach and Ike Quebec on a national tour.  Cousin Ernie Phipps led the big band The Monarchs of Rhythm with Eugene Phipps, Sr. at the Savoy Ballroom along with The Sultans of Swing, Poncho Diggs, and other big bands. During the 1950s Eugene Phipps co-led the house band at Newark's legendary Washington Bar, which  featured performers such as Babs Gonzales, Lew-Rew Jordan, and Ike Quebec.

In the 1950s Billy Phipps along with brother Nat Phipps formed a band whose members included Wayne Shorter, Grachan Moncur, Chris White, Charlie Mason, Harold Phipps and Robert Thomas.  Phipps began his jazz career playing bebop on flute and baritone saxophone. As a teenager, Phipps was a regular in Newark and New York bands, once opening for Billie Holiday.  In 1960 the Phipps band broke up to form the Mega Tones. Billy Phipps left the Mega Tones to tour with Buddy Johnson, Dizzy Gillespie and his Big Band, The Ray Charles Band, and "Brother" Jack McDuff. Encouraged by Wayne Shorter who introduced Phipps to John Coltrane, Phipps began shifting to hard bop in his style.  Despite a significant jazz career, the lack of Phipps's notoriety (as well as that of other black jazz performers) has been attributed to the reportage of white jazz critics.

Recording and performance 
Phipps recorded baritone sax on several seminal jazz albums, including Primitive Modern with the Gil Melle Quartet (1956), Gin and Orange (1969) with Brother Jack McDuff, and Ocho (1972) with Chico Mendoza. Phipps performed internationally, touring Sweden, France, England, and the Netherlands with McDuff's band. Phipps was a featured performer in 2003 during the Jazz Foundation of America's Annual "Great Night In Harlem" Concert at the Apollo Theater, hosted by Bill Cosby, Chevy Chase, Whoopi Goldberg and Branford Marsalis.  Despite failing health, Phipps continued to perform live in the New York city area and to record with other notable jazz musicians. In an homage to his Newark origins, Phipps performed with the Newark Jazz Elders, whose members provided a generational bridge between 1950s bebop and contemporary jazz.

Selected discography 
 Primitive Modern – Gil Melle Quartet (LP),  Prestige Records, 1956
 Gin and Orange – Jack McDuff (Album, CD),  Cadet, 1969
 Ocho (LP, Album), West Side Latino Records, 1972
 Joy of Cookin' – Joe Thomas (LP), Groove Merchant, 1972
 Tornado (LP),  El Sonido, 1976
 Mamey Colora'o / Sneakin' Up Behind You (LP), El Sonido, 1976
 Sabroso!: The Afro-Latin Groove (LP), Rhino Records, 1998
 Ocho (The First Album) (CD, Album, RE),  Universal Sound 2000
 The Woman in Me (CD),
Laranah Phipps Flat
5 Records (USA), 2001
 Moon Rappin'  (CD), Blue Note Records (USA), 2002
 Phipps & Friends '' (CD), Pipeline Music (USA), 2010

References 

American jazz baritone saxophonists
Musicians from Newark, New Jersey
Crossover jazz saxophonists
Hard bop saxophonists
2011 deaths
1931 births
20th-century American saxophonists